Granby Township is an inactive township in Newton County, in the U.S. state of Missouri.

Granby Township took its name from the community of Granby, Missouri.

References

Townships in Missouri
Townships in Newton County, Missouri